Billboard Top Hits: 1980 is a compilation album released by Rhino Records in 1992, featuring 10 hit recordings from 1980.

The track lineup includes five songs that reached the top of the Billboard Hot 100 chart, including the No. 1 song of 1980, "Call Me" by Blondie. The remaining four songs each reached the top five of the Hot 100.

Track listing

Track information and credits were taken from the album's liner notes.

References

1992 compilation albums
Billboard Top Hits albums
Rhino Records compilation albums